HS1, or High Speed 1, is the high-speed Channel Tunnel Rail Link running south from London to the tunnel between England and France.

HS1 or HS-1 may also refer to:

Transport
HS1, Formula One racing car built by the German team ATS
HS-1, designation of the Fox Chase Rapid Transit Line, an experimental rail line in Pennsylvania
HS-1, a variant of the Mrigasheer, a glider built by the Indian Civil Aviation Department

Military
Curtiss HS-1, a US Navy flying boat of World War I
HS-1, a former US Navy helicopter squadron known as the Seahorses, inactivated in 1997

Science and technology
HS1, a Hypersonic Gun tunnel at Imperial College, London, part of the UK's National Wind Tunnel Facility
HS1, an electrical stunning system produced by British company Ace Aquatec, used to ensure fish welfare at slaughter
HS1, a multimedia headset manufactured by US company Plantronics
HS1, a headset microphone manufactured by Australian company Røde Microphones
HS1, a designation for a type of automotive light bulb for motorcycles
HS-1, designation of one of the plutonium-gallium hemispheres used for the core in the first nuclear test detonation, codenamed Trinity
HS-1, a model of the Weisscam digital high-speed camera, manufactured by German company P+S Technik
HS-1, or Heteroscorpine, a polypeptide belonging to the Scorpine toxin family
HS-1, or Hymenistatin, a cyclic peptide

Music 

 Harry Styles (album), the 2017 debut album by Harry Styles

Other
HS1, a part of the British HS postcode area